Breathe is the fourth studio album by American country music artist Faith Hill. It was released November 9, 1999, via Warner Bros. Records. It won a Grammy Award for Best Country Album. Breathe is one of the most successful country/pop albums to date. It has been certified 8× Platinum by the RIAA, for shipping eight million copies in the US. The album includes the singles "Breathe", "The Way You Love Me", "Let's Make Love", and "If My Heart Had Wings". "Breathe" and "The Way You Love Me" both reached number one on the US Billboard Hot Country Songs chart; the former also peaked at number 2 on the Billboard Hot 100 and was the top pop song of 2000 according to Billboard Year-End. Several of the album's tracks also charted from unsolicited airplay.

The album debuted at number one on the Billboard 200, a career first for Hill. It sold 242,000 units, according to SoundScan. The album includes a cover version of Bette Midler's 1998 song "That's How Love Moves".

Track listing

Personnel
From Breathe liner notes.

Musicians

"What's In It for Me"
 Tim Akers – keyboards
 Mike Brignardello – bass guitar
 Lisa Cochran – background vocals
 Eric Darken – percussion
 Paul Franklin – steel guitar
 Aubrey Haynie – fiddle
 Dann Huff – electric guitar
 Gordon Kennedy – electric guitar
 B. James Lowry – acoustic guitar
 Chris Rodriguez – background vocals
 Lonnie Wilson – drums

"I Got My Baby"
 Bekka Bramlett – background vocals
 Larry Byrom – acoustic guitar
 Paul Franklin – steel guitar
 Aubrey Haynie – fiddle
 Michael Landau – electric guitar
 B. James Lowry – electric guitar
 Brent Mason – electric guitar
 Steve Nathan – keyboards
 Chris Rodriguez – background vocals
 Dennis Wilson – background vocals
 Lonnie Wilson – drums
 Glenn Worf – bass guitar

"Love Is a Sweet Thing"
 Tim Akers – keyboards
 Mike Brignardello – bass guitar
 Lisa Cochran – background vocals
 Eric Darken – percussion
 Paul Franklin – steel guitar
 Dann Huff – electric guitar
 Gordon Kennedy – electric guitar
 B. James Lowry – acoustic guitar
 Gene Miller – background vocals
 Lonnie Wilson – drums

"Breathe"
 Bekka Bramlett – background vocals
 Larry Byrom – acoustic guitar
 Stuart Duncan – fiddle
 Paul Franklin – steel guitar
 Michael Landau – electric guitar
 B. James Lowry – electric guitar
 Brent Mason – electric guitar
 Steve Nathan – keyboards
 Chris Rodriguez – background vocals
 Lonnie Wilson – drums
 Glenn Worf – bass guitar

"Let's Make Love"
 Larry Byrom – acoustic guitar
 Paul Franklin – steel guitar
 Aubrey Haynie – fiddle
 Michael Landau – electric guitar
 B. James Lowry – electric guitar
 Brent Mason – electric guitar
 Tim McGraw – guest vocals
 Steve Nathan – keyboards
 Kim Parent – background vocals
 Chris Rodriguez – background vocals
 Gary Smith – piano, organ
 Lonnie Wilson – drums
 Glenn Worf – bass guitar

"It Will Be Me"
 Bekka Bramlett – background vocals
 Larry Byrom – acoustic guitar
 Stuart Duncan – fiddle
 Paul Franklin – steel guitar
 Michael Landau – electric guitar
 B. James Lowry – electric guitar
 Brent Mason – electric guitar
 Steve Nathan – keyboards
 Chris Rodriguez – background vocals
 Lonnie Wilson – drums
 Glenn Worf – bass guitar

"The Way You Love Me"
 Stephanie Bentley – background vocals
 Bekka Bramlett – background vocals
 Larry Byrom – acoustic guitar
 Paul Franklin – steel guitar
 Aubrey Haynie – fiddle
 Michael Landau – electric guitar
 B. James Lowry – electric guitar
 Brent Mason – electric guitar
 Steve Nathan – keyboards
 Chris Rodriguez – background vocals
 Lonnie Wilson – drums
 Glenn Worf – bass guitar

"If I'm Not in Love"
 Larry Byrom – acoustic guitar
 Stuart Duncan – fiddle
 Paul Franklin – steel guitar
 Michael Landau – electric guitar
 B. James Lowry – electric guitar
 Brent Mason – electric guitar
 Nashville String Machine – strings
 Steve Nathan – keyboards
 Lonnie Wilson – drums
 Glenn Worf – bass guitar

"Bringing Out the Elvis"
 Tim Akers – keyboards
 Lisa Bevill – background vocals
 Mike Brignardello – bass guitar
 Lisa Cochran – background vocals
 Eric Darken – percussion
 Dann Huff – electric guitar
 Terry McMillan – harmonica
 Jerry McPherson – electric guitar
 Chris Rodriguez – background vocals
 Biff Watson – acoustic guitar
 Lonnie Wilson – drums

"If My Heart Had Wings"
 Bekka Bramlett – background vocals
 Larry Byrom – acoustic guitar
 Paul Franklin – steel guitar
 Aubrey Haynie – fiddle
 Michael Landau – electric guitar
 Brent Mason – electric guitar
 Steve Nathan – keyboards
 Kim Parent – background vocals
 Chris Rodriguez – background vocals
 John Willis – electric guitar
 Lonnie Wilson – drums
 Glenn Worf – bass guitar

"If I Should Fall Behind"
 Bekka Bramlett – background vocals
 Larry Byrom – acoustic guitar
 Paul Franklin – steel guitar
 Aubrey Haynie – fiddle
 B. James Lowry – electric guitar
 Brent Mason – electric guitar
 Steve Nathan – keyboards
 Chris Rodriguez – background vocals
 Lonnie Wilson – drums
 Glenn Worf – bass guitar

"That's How Love Moves"
 Tim Akers – keyboards
 Steve Brewster – drums
 Mike Brignardello – bass guitar
 Lisa Cochran – background vocals
 Eric Darken – percussion
 Paul Franklin – steel guitar
 Dann Huff – electric guitar
 Gordon Kennedy – electric guitar
 B. James Lowry – acoustic guitar
 Gene Miller – background vocals
 Nashville String Machine – strings

"There Will Come a Day"
 Bekka Bramlett – background vocals
 Mike Brignardello – bass guitar
 Larry Byrom – acoustic guitar
 Paul Franklin – steel guitar
 Aubrey Haynie – fiddle
 Michael Landau – electric guitar
 B. James Lowry – electric guitar
 Brent Mason – electric guitar
 Steve Nathan – organ, synthesizer
 Chris Rodriguez – background vocals
 Gary Smith – piano
 Lonnie Wilson – drums
 Glenn Worf – bass guitar

Technical
 Jeff Balding – recording (tracks 1, 3, 9, 12)
 Derek Bason – recording (tracks 1, 3, 9, 12)
 Byron Gallimore – production (all tracks except 1, 3, 9, 12)
 Carl Gorodetzky – string contractor (tracks 8, 12)
 Mark Hagen – recording (tracks 1, 3, 9, 12)
 Faith Hill – production (all tracks)
 Dann Huff – production (tracks 1, 3, 9, 12)
 Ronn Huff – string arrangements, conducting (tracks 8, 12)
 Julian King – recording (all tracks except 1, 3, 9, 12)
 Chris Lord-Alge – mixing (tracks 5, 11 only)
 Doug Sax – mastering
 Mike Shipley – mixing (all tracks except 5 and 11)
 Shawn Simpson – digital editing

Charts

Weekly charts

Year-end charts

Certifications

Awards and nominations

References 

1999 albums
Faith Hill albums
Warner Records albums
Albums produced by Dann Huff
Albums produced by Byron Gallimore
Grammy Award for Best Country Album
Canadian Country Music Association Top Selling Album albums